Lawrence George Bernard (February 9, 1914 – March 29, 1997), was a submarine commander during World War II who reached the rank of rear admiral in the United States Navy. Ensign Bernard graduated from the United States Naval Academy in 1937. Bernard was awarded the Silver Star and the Bronze Star Medal for his actions in these positions.

References 

United States Navy rear admirals (upper half)
United States submarine commanders
1914 births
1997 deaths
United States Navy personnel of World War II
United States Navy personnel of the Korean War
United States Navy personnel of the Vietnam War
Recipients of the Silver Star
United States Naval Academy alumni